"Välkommen hem" ("Welcome Home") is a holiday single by  Magnus Carlsson appearing in his 2006 album Spår i snön. The song is written by Mårten Sandén and Johan Röhr.

E.M.D. version

Swedish vocal group E.M.D., re-released it as their first single from their Christmas album of the same name. 

E.M.D.'s version was released as a charity single to raise money for Stadsmissionen, in support of helping the homeless.

Track listing
 "Välkommen hem" (Radio edit) - 3:08

Chart positions

2009 singles
E.M.D. songs
2009 songs

References